Frullanoides is a genus of liverworts in the family Lejeuneaceae, mostly found in the New World Tropics, with Frullanoides tristis having a distribution that extends into the Old World Tropics.

Species
Currently accepted species include:
Frullanoides bahamensis (A. Evans) Slageren
Frullanoides corticalis (Lehm. & Lindenb.) Slageren
Frullanoides densifolia Raddi
Frullanoides laciniatiflora (Loitl.) Slageren
Frullanoides liebmanniana (Lindenb. & Gottsche) Slageren
Frullanoides mexicana Slageren
Frullanoides tristis (Stephani) Slageren

References

Lejeuneaceae
Porellales genera